Garage Inc. is a compilation album of cover songs by American heavy metal band, Metallica. It was released on November 24, 1998, through Elektra Records. It includes cover songs, B-side covers, and The $5.98 E.P. - Garage Days Re-Revisited, which had gone out of print since its original release in 1987. The title is a combination of Garage Days Revisited and Metallica's song "Damage, Inc.", from Master of Puppets. The album's graphical cover draws heavily from the 1987 EP. The album features songs by artists that have influenced Metallica, including many bands from new wave of British heavy metal, hardcore punk bands and popular songs.

Production
The day after Metallica finished the North American leg of the Poor Re-Touring Me Tour in San Diego's Coors Amphitheatre, they hit the studio to start recording a new album of cover versions. As Lars Ulrich explained, the band wanted to do something different after "three pretty serious albums in a row, starting with the Black album and then Load and ReLoad", and the process would be easier by working with covers, especially as the band had a tradition of taking other people's songs  and  "turn them into something very Metallica, different from what the original artist did". Given that the band had recorded many covers that were spread across various releases, such as B-sides of their singles and the 1987 EP The $5.98 E.P. - Garage Days Re-Revisited, the band would "put them all in a nice little packaging for easy listening" along with the newly recorded cover versions, chosen through a group decision. Only one of the eleven songs in the "New Recordings '98" disk was not done in the three-week sessions, a version of Lynyrd Skynyrd's  "Tuesday's Gone" the band recorded for a radio broadcast along with friends such as Les Claypool, John Popper and Gary Rossington.

Garage Barrage Tour
Metallica played five shows in November 1998 to support the album's release. Embracing the cover song concept, the band's setlist consisted entirely of cover songs from throughout their career.  Metallica's own music was presented by the opening band, Battery, a Metallica tribute band.

Packaging
The cover for Garage Inc. had an Anton Corbijn photograph of Metallica dressed as mechanics. The band wanted the booklet to hold a detailed account of the contents of the project, and designer Andy Airfix was allowed to search through Ulrich's catalogue of Metallica memorabilia in San Francisco to create a 32-page booklet. Airfix also did the back cover, where the front of Garage Days Re-Revisited was modified with headshots of Metallica in 1998 and the track list written on tracing paper.

Reception

Rolling Stone (12/10/98, print edition, p. 122) – 4 Stars (out of 5) – "Gloriously hard as the album is, you can't miss Metallica's good natured side coming through."
Entertainment Weekly (12/18/98, p. 84) – "We'll have to wait until Metallica's next 'proper' album to find out if this trip to the garage recharges their batteries. Still, all things considered, Garage Inc. is an intermittently exhilarating joyride." – Rating: B−
CMJ (12/21/98, p. 29) – "Those who still relate to the adolescent angst of the 'Metallicas' earliest days will find plenty to like on Garage Inc."
 In 2005, the album was ranked number 500 in Rock Hard magazine's book of The 500 Greatest Rock & Metal Albums of All Time.

Track listing

Disc one
These tracks (except "Tuesday's Gone"; see below) were recorded in September–October 1998 for the Garage Inc. album.

 "Sabbra Cadabra" also covers part of the Black Sabbath song "A National Acrobat".
 "Mercyful Fate" is a medley of the songs "Satan's Fall", "Curse of the Pharaohs", "A Corpse Without Soul", "Into the Coven" and "Evil".
 "Tuesday's Gone" was recorded December 18, 1997, during the "Don't Call Us, We'll Call You" radio broadcast on KSJO.
 "The More I See" ends at 03:23 and, after a period of silence, contains a short segment of the Robin Trower song "Bridge of Sighs", from the album of the same name, as a hidden track.
 "Free Speech for the Dumb", "Loverman", "Astronomy", "The More I See" and "Bridge of Sighs" have never been performed live.

Disc two
These tracks are a collection of B-sides from artists Metallica were inspired by, throughout the early years of the band.

 "Last Caress/Green Hell" contains a parody of Iron Maiden's song "Run to the Hills" at the outro; Iron Maiden responded to this on a B-side cover of the Montrose song titled "Space Station No. 5". The original CD edition has a mastering error in "Green Hell" at 2:01 where the left channel glitches and is out of sync with the right channel for a second. This error does not exist on the original EP release, nor the remastered EP edition. 
 "Am I Evil?" and "Blitzkrieg" were originally released in November 1984 as B-sides contained on the "Creeping Death" single. They were later included as bonus tracks on the 1988 Elektra re-issue of Metallica's debut album Kill 'Em All; subsequent re-issues of Kill 'Em All did not contain the two bonus tracks. 
 "Breadfan" and "The Prince" were originally released by Metallica in September 1988 as B-sides to the "Harvester of Sorrow" single. "Breadfan" was also included on the "Eye of the Beholder" single. "The Prince" was also the B-side to the "One" single, as well as the bonus track on the Japanese pressing of …And Justice For All.
 "Stone Cold Crazy" was originally released by Metallica in September 1990 on the Rubáiyát: Elektra's 40th Anniversary compilation album, and was later included on the "Enter Sandman" single.
 "So What" and "Killing Time" were originally released by Metallica in November 1991 as B-sides to "The Unforgiven" single. "So What" was also on the "Sad but True" single, as well as the bonus track on the Japanese pressing of Metallica.
"Motörheadache" was recorded live at The Plant Studios in December, 1995

Personnel

Metallica
 James Hetfield – vocals, rhythm guitar, lead guitar on "Whiskey in the Jar" and "Stone Dead Forever"
 Lars Ulrich – drums
 Kirk Hammett – lead guitar, backing vocals
 Jason Newsted – bass, backing vocals
 Cliff Burton – bass on "Am I Evil?" and "Blitzkrieg"

Guest musicians on "Tuesday's Gone"
 Pepper Keenan – co-lead vocals
 Jerry Cantrell – guitar
 Sean Kinney – additional percussion
 Jim Martin – guitar
 John Popper – harmonica
 Gary Rossington – additional guitar
 Les Claypool – banjo

Technical personnel

Disc I
 Bob Rock, James Hetfield, Lars Ulrich – production
Randy Staub – engineering
Brian Dobbs – additional engineering
Kent Matcke, Leff Lefferts, Chris Manning – assistant engineers
Paul DeCarli, Mike Gillies – digital editing
Randy Staub, Mike Fraser – mixing
George Marino – mastering

Disc II
 Tracks 1–5:
 "Not very produced" by Metallica (Hetfield, Ulrich, Hammett, Newsted)
 Csaba "The Hut" Petocz – engineering
 Tracks 6–7:
 Metallica (Hetfield, Ulrich, Burton, Hammett), Mark Whitaker – production
 Jeffrey "Nick" Norman – engineering
 Tracks 8–9
 Not produced
 Mike Clink, Toby "Rage" Wright – engineering
 Flemming Rasmussen – rough mixing
 Track 10
 "Kind of produced" by Metallica (Hetfield, Ulrich, Hammett, Newsted)
 Toby "Rage" Wright – engineering
 Tracks 11–12
 "Roughly produced" by Bob Rock with Hetfield & Ulrich
 Randy Staub – engineering
 Tracks 13–16
 Not produced
 Randy Staub – mixing
 George Marino – remastering

 Andie Airfix – album design
 Anton Corbijn – front cover photography, additional photography
Ross Halfin – back cover photography, additional photography
 Mark Leialoha – additional photography
 David Fricke – liner notes

Charts

Album

Year-end charts

Singles

Sales and certifications
In the U.S., Garage Inc. sold 426,500 units in the first week of release, making Metallica's fourth straight debut surpassing 400,000 copies. Still, the million-plus record breaking debut of Garth Brooks' Double Live made Garage Inc. land only at second on the Billboard 200.

Awards

Grammy Awards

References

External links
Information about the album on the official website

1998 compilation albums
Albums produced by Bob Rock
Covers albums
Metallica compilation albums
Elektra Records compilation albums
Vertigo Records compilation albums
B-side compilation albums